Platinum Hits is a term used to refer to a line of select Xbox games that were considered by Microsoft to have sold considerable units on the platform in the nine months after release, and have dropped in price from their original MSRP to a newer, lower price, generally that of $19.99, although multi-game packs may sell for more. 
A similar budget range in PAL markets is known as Xbox Classics for £19.99 and Best of Classics for £9.99. In Japan, they are known as Platinum Collection games and generally cost ¥2,800, with a number of games such as Grand Theft Auto IV and Dynasty Warriors 6 at a higher price point of ¥3,800. Sales requirements may vary by region.

On September 8, 2006, Microsoft announced the Platinum Collection would be extended to the Xbox 360 platform. On September 20, 2006, at Microsoft's Pre-Tokyo Game Show conference, they announced Platinum Hits for the Xbox 360 in North America, priced at $29.99 and Classics in the UK for £24.99. A second wave of titles was released in early 2007, with additional games being added periodically.

Platinum Family Hits are special Platinum Hits that have been designated appropriate for all ages. All current Platinum Family Hits are rated "E" by the ESRB, except for T-rated X-Men Legends and four E10+ rated games -- Sonic the Hedgehog, Sonic Unleashed, Lego Star Wars II: The Original Trilogy and Banjo-Kazooie: Nuts & Bolts. Not all Platinum Hits offerings that receive an E rating are labeled with the Family Hits designation, however.
As with Platinum Hits, the new suggested retail (MSRP) is $19.99.

Best of Platinum Hits are select best-selling Platinum Hits that have a suggested retail price of $9.99 and a slightly different "Best of Platinum Hits" logo on the package design. Best of Platinum Family Hits are chosen from the Platinum Family Hits line.

Original Xbox

Games in Platinum Hits series

007: Agent Under Fire 
007: Everything or Nothing
007: Nightfire
50 Cent: Bulletproof
Amped: Freestyle Snowboarding
Atari Anthology
ATV: Quad Power Racing 2
Baldur's Gate: Dark Alliance
Black
Blitz: The League
Blood Wake
Burnout 3: Takedown
Burnout Revenge
Brute Force
Cabela's Dangerous Hunts
Call of Duty: Finest Hour
Call of Duty 2: Big Red One
Call of Duty 3
Conflict: Desert Storm
Counter-Strike
Crimson Skies: High Road to Revenge
Dave Mirra Freestyle BMX 2
Dead or Alive 3
Dead to Rights
Def Jam: Fight for NY
Destroy All Humans!
Doom 3
Enter the Matrix
Fable: The Lost Chapters
Fight Night 2004
Fight Night Round 2
Forza Motorsport
Fuzion Frenzy
Full Spectrum Warrior
GoldenEye: Rogue Agent
Grand Theft Auto: San Andreas
Grand Theft Auto: Double Pack
Greg Hastings Tournament Paintball
Halo: Combat Evolved
Halo 2
Hitman 2: Silent Assassin
Juiced
Marvel Ultimate Alliance
Max Payne
MechAssault
MechAssault 2: Lone Wolf
Medal of Honor: Frontline
Medal of Honor: Rising Sun
Mercenaries: Playground of Destruction
Midnight Club II
Midnight Club 3: DUB Edition Remix
Mortal Kombat: Deadly Alliance
Mortal Kombat: Deception
MVP Baseball 2005
MX vs. ATV Unleashed
NBA Ballers
NBA Street Vol. 2
Need for Speed: Hot Pursuit 2
Need for Speed: Most Wanted
Need for Speed Underground
Need for Speed Underground 2
NFL Street
Ninja Gaiden
Ninja Gaiden: Black
Oddworld: Munch's Oddysee
Prince of Persia: The Sands of Time
Prince of Persia: Warrior Within
Project Gotham Racing
Project Gotham Racing 2
Rallisport Challenge
Red Dead Revolver
Return to Castle Wolfenstein: Tides of War
Silent Hill 2: Restless Dreams
SoulCalibur II
Spider-Man
Spider-Man 2
Spy Hunter
SSX Tricky
Star Wars: Battlefront
Star Wars: Battlefront II
Star Wars: Episode III: Revenge of the Sith
Star Wars: Knights of the Old Republic
Star Wars: Knights of the Old Republic II: The Sith Lords
Star Wars: Obi-Wan
Star Wars: Republic Commando
Star Wars: Starfighter Special Edition
Test Drive
The Chronicles of Riddick: Escape from Butcher Bay
The Elder Scrolls III: Morrowind
The Elder Scrolls III: Morrowind - GOTY Edition
The Godfather: The Game
The Incredibles
The Lord of the Rings: The Fellowship of the Ring
The Lord of the Rings: Return of the King
The Lord of the Rings: The Two Towers
The Simpsons: Hit & Run
The Simpsons: Road Rage
Tom Clancy's Classic Trilogy
Tom Clancy's Ghost Recon
Tom Clancy's Ghost Recon 2
Tom Clancy's Ghost Recon: Island Thunder
Tom Clancy's Rainbow Six 3
Tom Clancy's Splinter Cell
Tom Clancy's Splinter Cell: Pandora Tomorrow
Tom Clancy's Splinter Cell: Chaos Theory
Tony Hawk's American Wasteland
Tony Hawk's Pro Skater 3
Tony Hawk's Pro Skater 4
Tony Hawk's Project 8
Tony Hawk's Underground
Tony Hawk's Underground 2
True Crime: Streets of L.A.
Unreal Championship
Wreckless: The Yakuza Missions
WWE RAW
WWE Raw 2
WWE WrestleMania 21

Games in Best of Platinum Hits series

007: Agent Under Fire
007: Nightfire
Burnout 3: Takedown
Cabela's Dangerous Hunts
Call of Duty: Finest Hour
Counter-Strike
Fable: The Lost Chapters
Fuzion Frenzy
Greg Hastings Tournament Paintball
Halo: Combat Evolved
Halo 2
MechAssault
Need For Speed: Underground
Need For Speed: Underground 2
Project Gotham Racing 2
Return to Castle Wolfenstein: Tides of War
SoulCalibur II
Spider-Man
Spider-Man 2
SSX Tricky
The Elder Scrolls III: Morrowind - GOTY Edition
The Simpsons: Road Rage
Tom Clancy's Ghost Recon
Tom Clancy's Ghost Recon: Island Thunder
Tom Clancy's Rainbow Six 3
Tom Clancy's Splinter Cell
Tom Clancy's Splinter Cell: Pandora Tomorrow
Tony Hawk's Pro Skater 4
Tony Hawk's Underground
Tony Hawk's Underground 2
True Crime: Streets of L.A.

Games in Platinum Family Hits series

Blinx: The Time Sweeper
Cars
Crash Bandicoot: The Wrath of Cortex
Crash Bandicoot: The Wrath of Cortex/Crash Nitro Kart Bundle
Crash Nitro Kart
Crash Tag Team Racing
Crash Twinsanity
Dance Dance Revolution ULTRAMIX
Disney/Pixar's Finding Nemo
Dreamwork's Shark Tale
Harry Potter and the Chamber of Secrets
Harry Potter: Quidditch World Cup
Harry Potter and the Prisoner of Azkaban
Lego Star Wars: The Video Game
Lego Star Wars II: The Original Trilogy
Namco Museum
Over the Hedge
Pac-Man World 2
Shrek 2
Shrek 2/Dreamwork's Shark Tale Bundle
Sonic Heroes
Sonic Heroes/Super Monkey Ball Deluxe Bundle
Sonic Mega Collection Plus
Sonic Mega Collection Plus/Super Monkey Ball Deluxe Bundle
SpongeBob SquarePants: Battle for Bikini Bottom
SpongeBob SquarePants: Lights, Camera, Pants!
Teenage Mutant Ninja Turtles
The Sims
The Sims 2
The Sims Bustin' Out
Thrillville
The SpongeBob SquarePants Movie
Yu-Gi-Oh! The Dawn of Destiny
X-Men Legends

Games in Best of Platinum Family Hits series
Madagascar
Shrek 2
The Sims

Games in Classics series (132)

50 Cent: Bulletproof
Amped: Freestyle Snowboarding
Blinx: The Time Sweeper
Buffy: The Vampire Slayer
Burnout
Burnout 3: Takedown
Burnout Revenge
Call of Duty: Finest Hour
Call of Duty 2: Big Red One
Cars
Colin McRae Rally 3
Colin McRae Rally 04
Colin McRae Rally 2005
Conflict: Desert Storm
Conflict: Desert Storm II
Conflict: Vietnam
Conker: Live & Reloaded
Counter-Strike
Crash Bandicoot: The Wrath of Cortex
Crash Nitro Kart
Crash Tag Team Racing
Crash Twinsanity
Dead or Alive 3
Dead or Alive Xtreme Beach Volleyball
Doom 3
Driv3r
DTM Race Driver 2
Enter the Matrix
Fable: The Lost Chapters
FIFA 2003
FIFA 2004
FIFA 2005
FIFA 06
FIFA Street
FIFA Street 2
Finding Nemo
Forza Motorsport
Full Spectrum Warrior
GoldenEye: Rogue Agent
Grand Theft Auto: San Andreas
Gun
Halo: Combat Evolved
Halo 2
Harry Potter and the Chamber of Secrets
Harry Potter and the Prisoner of Azkaban
Harry Potter and the Goblet of Fire
Harry Potter: Quidditch World Cup
Hitman 2: Silent Assassin
Hulk
Ice Age 2: The Meltdown
Jade Empire
James Bond 007: Agent Under Fire 
James Bond 007: Everything or Nothing
James Bond 007: Nightfire
Juiced
Lego Star Wars: The Video Game
Madagascar
Max Payne
Medal of Honor: European Assault
Medal of Honor: Frontline
Medal of Honor: Rising Sun
Men of Valor
Metal Gear Solid 2: Substance
Midtown Madness 3
Mortal Kombat Deadly Alliance
Moto GP: Ultimate Racing Technology
Moto GP – Ultimate Racing Technology 2
Need for Speed: Most Wanted
Need for Speed: Underground
Need for Speed: Underground 2
Ninja Gaiden
Ninja Gaiden Black
Oddworld: Munch's Oddysee
Pirates of the Caribbean
Prince of Persia: The Sands of Time
Prince of Persia: The Two Thrones
Prince of Persia: Warrior Within
Pro Evolution Soccer 4
Project Gotham Racing
Project Gotham Racing 2
RalliSport Challenge
RalliSport Challenge 2
Rayman 3: Hoodlum Havoc
Return to Castle Wolfenstein: Tides of War
Ricky Ponting International Cricket 2005
Rugby League (NRL)
Shrek 2
Sonic Heroes
Sonic Mega Collection Plus
Spider-Man
Spider-Man 2
Spyro: A Hero's Tail
SSX 3
SSX Tricky
Star Wars: Battlefront
Star Wars: Battlefront II
Star Wars: Episode III – Revenge of the Sith
Star Wars: Knights of the Old Republic
The Chronicles of Riddick: Escape From Butcher Bay
The Elder Scrolls III: Morrowind
The Incredibles
The Lord of the Rings: The Fellowship of the Ring
The Lord of the Rings: The Return of the King
The Lord of the Rings: The Third Age
The Lord of the Rings: The Two Towers
The Simpsons: Hit & Run
The Sims: Bustin' Out
The Urbz: Sims in the City
TimeSplitters 2
TOCA Race Driver 2
Tom Clancy's Ghost Recon
Tom Clancy's Ghost Recon 2
Tom Clancy's Ghost Recon: Island Thunder
Tom Clancy's Rainbow Six 3
Tom Clancy's Rainbow Six 3: Black Arrow
Tom Clancy's Splinter Cell
Tony Hawk's American Wasteland
Tony Hawk's Pro Skater 3
Tony Hawk's Pro Skater 4
Tony Hawk's Underground
Tony Hawk's Underground 2
Top Spin
True Crime: New York City
True Crime: Streets of LA
Turok Evolution
Unreal Championship
V8 Supercars Australia 2
V8 Supercars Australia 3
Worms 3D
Wreckless: The Yakuza Missions
WWE WrestleMania 21
XIII

Games in Best of Classics series (11)

Counter-Strike
Crash Bandicoot: The Wrath of Cortex
Crash Nitro Kart
Crash Twinsanity
Driv3r
Fable: The Lost Chapters
Halo: Combat Evolved
Halo 2
Project Gotham Racing 2
Sonic Heroes
The Simpsons: Hit & Run

Games in Platinum Collection series

Atari Anthology
Buffy the Vampire Slayer: Chaos Bleeds
Counter-Strike 
Crazy Taxi 3: High Roller
Dead Man's Hand 
Dead or Alive 3
Dead or Alive Ultimate
Dead or Alive Xtreme Beach Volleyball
Dino Crisis 3
Dr. Seuss' The Cat in the Hat 
Halo: Combat Evolved
Halo 2
Halo: History Pack
Hitman 2: Silent Assassin
Hunter: The Reckoning: Redeemer
Inside Pitch 2003
Jockey's Road
Kurenai no Umi
Links 2004 
Magic: The Gathering - Battlegrounds
Metal Arms: Glitch in the System
Murakumo: Renegade Mech Pursuit
Muzzle Flash
Ninja Gaiden Black
Otogi
Otogi: Hyakki Toubatsu Emaki
Outlaw Golf
Outlaw Volleyball
Panzer Dragoon Orta
Project Gotham Racing 2
Rapala Pro Fishing
Return to Castle Wolfenstein: Tides of War
Rocky: Legends
Shin Megami Tensei: Nine
Shrek 2
SoulCalibur II
Star Wars Jedi Knight: Jedi Academy
SWAT: Global Strike Team
Tao Feng: Fist of the Lotus
The Simpsons: Hit & Run 
Tony Hawk's Underground: Pro Skater 2003 
Unreal Championship 
Voodoo Vince 
Wakeboarding Unleashed Featuring Shaun Murray 
X-Men Legends

Xbox 360

Games in Platinum Hits for Xbox 360 series

Ace Combat 6: Fires of Liberation
Army of Two
Army of Two: The 40th Day
Assassin's Creed
Assassin's Creed II
Assassin's Creed III
Assassin's Creed Brotherhood
Assassin's Creed Revelations
Banjo-Kazooie: Nuts & Bolts
Batman: Arkham Asylum: Game of the Year Edition
Batman Arkham City Game of the Year Edition
Battlefield 2: Modern Combat
Battlefield: Bad Company
Battlefield: Bad Company 2
Battlefield 3
BioShock
BioShock 2
BioShock Infinite
Borderlands
Borderlands 2
Burnout Paradise
Burnout Revenge
Call of Duty 2 Special Edition
Call of Duty 3
Call of Duty 4 Modern Warfare
Call of Duty: Modern Warfare 2
Call of Duty: Black Ops
Call of Duty: Black Ops II
Call of Duty: World at War
Cars
Condemned: Criminal Origins
Crackdown
Crysis 2
Dante's Inferno 
Dark Souls
Dead Island: Game of the Year Edition
Dead or Alive 4
Dead Rising
Dead Rising 2
Dead Space
Dead Space 2
Dead Space 3
Devil May Cry 4
Dishonored
Fable II
Fallout 3: Game of the Year Edition
Fallout: New Vegas - Ultimate Edition
Far Cry 3
F.E.A.R.
Fight Night Round 3
Fight Night Round 4
Final Fantasy XIII
Forza Motorsport 2
Forza Motorsport 3
Forza Motorsport 4
Forza Horizon
Game Party: In Motion
Gears of War 
Gears of War 2
Grand Theft Auto: Episodes from Liberty City
Grand Theft Auto IV
Grand Theft Auto V
Grand Theft Auto: San Andreas
Guitar Hero: Aerosmith
Guitar Hero 3: Legends of Rock
Halo: Combat Evolved Anniversary
Halo 3
Halo 3 ODST
Halo: Reach
Halo Wars
Homefront
Injustice: Gods Among Us - Ultimate Edition
Just Dance 3
Just Dance 4
Kameo: Elements of Power
L.A. Noire
Left 4 Dead
Left 4 Dead 2 
Lego Batman: The Video Game
Lego Batman 2: DC Super Heroes
Lego Harry Potter: Years 1-4
Lego Indiana Jones: The Original Adventures
Lego Indiana Jones 2: The Adventure Continues
Lego Marvel Super Heroes
Lego Pirates of the Caribbean: The Video Game
Lego Star Wars: The Complete Saga
Lego Star Wars II: The Original Trilogy
Lego Star Wars III: The Clone Wars
Lego The Lord of the Rings
Lost Planet: Extreme Condition Colonies Edition
Mafia II
Marvel: Ultimate Alliance
Mass Effect
Mass Effect 2
Medal of Honor
Michael Jackson: The Experience
Midnight Club Los Angeles: Complete Edition
Mortal Kombat Komplete Edition
Mortal Kombat vs. DC Universe
MX vs. ATV Alive
MX vs. ATV Reflex
Need for Speed: Hot Pursuit
Need for Speed: Most Wanted
Need for Speed: Most Wanted - A Criterion Game
Need for Speed: ProStreet
Need for Speed: Shift
Need for Speed: The Run
Need for Speed: Undercover
Ninja Gaiden II
Platinum Hits Triple Pack
Plants vs. Zombies
Plants vs. Zombies: Garden Warfare
Perfect Dark Zero
Portal 2
Prey
Project Gotham Racing 3
Prototype
Rage
Ratatouille
Red Dead Redemption
Resident Evil 5
Resident Evil 6
Rock Band - Complete Edition
Rock Band 2 - Premium Edition
Rock Band 3 - Ultimate Edition
Rockstar Games Presents Table Tennis
Saints Row
Saints Row 2
Saints Row: The Third
Saints Row IV National Treasure Edition
Shrek the Third
Sniper: Ghost Warrior
Skate 2
Skate 3
Sonic Free Riders
Sonic Generations
Sonic the Hedgehog
Sonic's Ultimate Genesis Collection
Sonic Unleashed
SoulCalibur IV
South Park: The Stick of Truth
Spider-Man 3
Spider-Man: Friend or Foe
Star Wars: The Force Unleashed
Star Wars: The Force Unleashed II
Street Fighter IV
Tekken 6
The Biggest Loser: Ultimate Workout
The Elder Scrolls IV: Oblivion Game Of The Year Edition
The Elder Scrolls V: Skyrim Legendary Edition
The Orange Box
The Sims 3
Tom Clancy's Ghost Recon Advanced Warfighter
Tom Clancy's Ghost Recon Advanced Warfighter 2
Tom Clancy's Rainbow Six: Vegas
Tom Clancy's Rainbow Six: Vegas 2
Tom Clancy's Splinter Cell: Conviction
Tomb Raider
Tony Hawk's Project 8
Top Spin 2
Transformers: The Game
UFC Undisputed 2009
UFC Undisputed 3
Viva Piñata
Watch Dogs
WWE SmackDown vs. Raw 2007
WWE SmackDown vs. Raw 2008
WWE SmackDown vs. Raw 2009
WWE SmackDown vs. Raw 2010

Games in Xbox Classics for Xbox 360 series

Army of Two
Army of Two: The 40th Day
Assassin's Creed
Assassin's Creed II: Game of the Year Edition
Assassin's Creed III
Assassin's Creed IV Black Flag
Assassin's Creed Brotherhood
Assassin's Creed Revelations
Assassin's Creed Rogue
Batman Arkham Asylum
Batman Arkham City
Battlefield 3
Battlefield: Bad Company
Battlefield: Bad Company 2
BioShock
Borderlands
Borderlands 2
Burnout Revenge
Burnout Paradise
Call of Duty 2
Call of Duty 3
Call of Duty 4: Modern Warfare
Call of Duty: Modern Warfare 2
Call of Duty: World at War
Call of Duty: Black Ops
Call of Duty: Black Ops II
Call of Juarez: Bound in Blood
Cars 2
Command & Conquer 3: Tiberium Wars
Condemned: Criminal Origins
Colin McRae: Dirt
Crackdown
Crash of the Titans
Crysis 2
Crysis 3
Dante's Inferno
Darksiders
Darksiders II
Dead or Alive 4
Dead Island: Game of the Year Edition
Dead Rising
Dead Rising 2
Dead Space
Dead Space 2
Deus Ex Human Revolution
Dragon Ball Raging Blast
Dragon Ball Raging Blast 2	
Dragon Ball Z Burst Limit
DiRT 3
Driver San Francisco
F1 2012
Fable II
Fallout 3
Fallout 3: Game of the Year Edition
Fallout: New Vegas - Ultimate Edition
Far Cry 2	
Far Cry 3	
Far Cry 4
FIFA 07
FIFA 08
FIFA 09
FIFA 10	
FIFA 11
FIFA 12
FIFA Street
FIFA Street 3
Fight Night Round 3
Fight Night Round 4
Forza Motorsport 2
Forza Motorsport 3
Gears of War
Gears of War 2
Grand Theft Auto: San Andreas
Grand Theft Auto IV
Halo 3
Halo 3: ODST
Halo: Reach
Halo Wars
Hitman: Blood Money
Just Cause
Just Cause 2
Just Dance 2015
Kane & Lynch: Dead Men	
Kane & Lynch 2: Dog Days
Kameo: Elements of Power
Left 4 Dead
Left 4 Dead 2
Lego Batman: The Videogame	
Lego Batman 2: DC Super Heroes
Lego Harry Potter: Years 1–4
Lego Harry Potter: Years 5–7
Lego Indiana Jones: The Original Adventures
Lego Marvel Super Heroes
Lego Pirates of the Caribbean: The Video Game
Lego Star Wars II: The Original Trilogy
Lego Star Wars: The Complete Saga
Lego Star Wars III: The Clone Wars
Lost Planet: Colonies
Mafia II
Mass Effect
Mass Effect 2
Mass Effect 3
Medal of Honor: Airborne	
Medal of Honor
Metro 2033
Midnight Club: Los Angeles Complete Edition
Mirror's Edge
Monopoly Streets	
Mortal Kombat	
MotionSports
Naruto: Rise of a Ninja
Naruto Shippuden: Ultimate Ninja Storm 2
Naruto Shippuden: Ultimate Ninja Storm 3
Need for Speed: Carbon
Need for Speed: Most Wanted
Need for Speed: Most Wanted - A Criterion Game
Need for Speed: ProStreet
Need for Speed: Rivals
Need for Speed: Shift
Need for Speed: Undercover
Payday 2
Perfect Dark Zero
Peter Jackson's King Kong: The Official Game of the Movie
Prototype
Pro Evolution Soccer 6
Pro Evolution Soccer 2008
Pro Evolution Soccer 2009
Pro Evolution Soccer 2010
Pro Evolution Soccer 2011	
Pro Evolution Soccer 2012
Project Gotham Racing 3
Project Gotham Racing 4
Rabbids: Alive & Kicking
Race Driver: Grid - Reloaded
Ratatouille	
Rayman Origins	
Rayman Legends	
Red Dead Redemption
Resident Evil 5
Rockstar Games Presents Table Tennis
Saints Row
Saints Row 2
Saints Row: The Third The Full Package	
Sega Mega Drive Ultimate Collection
Sega Superstars Tennis
Skate	
Skate 3
Sleeping Dogs
Sniper Elite V2
Sonic & Sega All-Stars Racing	
Sonic & All-Stars Racing Transformed
Sonic Generations
Sonic Unleashed
SoulCalibur IV
South Park: The Stick of Truth	
Sniper: Ghost Warrior
Star Wars: The Force Unleashed
Star Wars: The Force Unleashed - Ultimate Sith Edition
Star Wars: The Force Unleashed II
Street Fighter IV
Tekken 6
Terraria
Test Drive Unlimited
The Elder Scrolls IV: Oblivion
The Elder Scrolls V: Skyrim
The LEGO Movie Videogame
The Simpsons Game
The Sims 3
The Witcher 2
Tom Clancy's EndWar
Tom Clancy's Ghost Recon Advanced Warfighter
Tom Clancy's Ghost Recon Advanced Warfighter 2
Tom Clancy's Ghost Recon: Future Soldier
Tom Clancy's Splinter Cell: Double Agent
Tom Clancy's Splinter Cell: Conviction
Tom Clancy's Rainbow Six: Vegas
Tom Clancy's Rainbow Six: Vegas 2
Tomb Raider: Legend
Tomb Raider: Anniversary
Tomb Raider: Underworld
Tomb Raider
UFC 2009 Undisputed
UFC Undisputed 2010
Viva Piñata
Watch Dogs
Wall-E
WWE SmackDown vs. Raw 2007
WWE SmackDown vs. Raw 2008
WWE SmackDown vs. Raw 2009
WWE SmackDown vs. Raw 2010
WWE SmackDown vs. Raw 2011

Games in Platinum Collection for Xbox 360 series

Ace Combat 6: Fires of Liberation
Ace Combat: Assault Horizon
Alan Wake
Armored Core 4
Armored Core: For Answer
Assassin's Creed
Assassin's Creed II: Special Edition
Assassin's Creed: Brotherhood Special Edition
Assassin's Creed: Revelations Special Edition
Assassin's Creed I + II Welcome Pack
Atsumare! Pinata
Atsumare! Viva Pinata 2: Garden wa Dai-Punch 
Banjo to Kazooie no Daibouken: Garage Daisakusen
Battlefield 2: Modern Combat
Battlefield 3
Battlefield: Bad Company
Battlefield: Bad Company 2 Ultimate Edition
Bayonetta
Beautiful Katamari Damacy
BioHazard 5
BioHazard 6
BioShock
BlazBlue: Calamity Trigger
Blue Dragon
Borderlands
Bullet Witch
Burnout Revenge
Call of Duty 4: Modern Warfare
Call of Duty: Modern Warfare 2
Chaos;Head Noah
Chaos;Head Love Chu Chu!
Chikyū Bōeigun 3
Chromehounds
Dance Central
Dance Central 2
Dance Evolution
Dead or Alive 4
Dead or Alive Xtreme 2
Dead Rising
Dead Rising 2
Dead Rising/Gears of War Platinum Double Pack
Deathsmiles
Deathsmiles II
Dennō Senki Virtual-On Force
Devil May Cry 4
DoDonPachi Daifukkatsu Ver 1.5
DoDonPachi SaiDaiŌJō
Dragon Age: Origins
Dragon's Dogma
Dream Club
Dream Club Zero
Earth Defense Force: Insect Armageddon
End of Eternity
Espgaluda II Black Label
Every Party
Fable II
Fable III
Fallout 3
Fallout 3: Game Of The Year Edition
Far Cry 2
Fight Night Round 3
Final Fantasy XIII
Final Fantasy XIII-2
Forza Motorsport 2
Forza Motorsport 4
Gears of War
Gears of War 2
Gears of War 3
Gears of War: Judgment
Gears of War Twin Pack
Gears of War: Trilogy Pack
Grand Theft Auto IV
Gundam Musō International
Gundam Musō 2
Gundam Musō 3
Halo 3
Halo 3: ODST
Halo: Reach
Halo Wars
Hokuto Musō
Infinite Undiscovery
Kinect Disneyland Adventures
Kinect Rush: A Disney-Pixar Adventure
Kinect Sports
Kinect Sports: Season Two
Kinect Star Wars
Kingdom Under Fire: Circle of Doom
Left 4 Dead
Left 4 Dead 2
Lollipop Chainsaw
Lost Odyssey
Lost Planet: Colonies
Lost Planet: Extreme Condition
Lost Planet 2
Magna Carta 2
Mass Effect
Mass Effect 2
Mushihimesama Futari Ver 1.5
Need for Speed: Most Wanted
Nier Gestalt
Ninety-Nine Nights
Ninja Blade
Ninja Gaiden II
Oneechanbara VorteX: The Descendants of The Cursed Blood
Otomedius G
Perfect Dark Zero
Prince of Persia
Project Gotham Racing 3
Project Gotham Racing 4
Project Sylpheed
Riot Act
Riot Act 2
Rockstar Games Presents Table Tennis
Rumble Roses XX
Sacred 2: Fallen Angel 
Saints Row
Saints Row 2
Saints Row: The Third
Senko No Ronde Rev.X 
Shin Sangoku Musō 5
Sonic Free Riders
Soulcalibur IV
Steins;Gate
Steins;Gate: Hiyoku Renri no Darling 
Super Street Fighter IV: Arcade Edition
Super Robot Taisen XO
Tales of Vesperia
Tekken 6
Tekken Tag Tournament 2
Tenchu Senran
Test Drive Unlimited
The Elder Scrolls IV: Oblivion
The Elder Scrolls IV: Oblivion Game Of The Year Edition
The Elder Scrolls V: Skyrim
The Idolm@ster
The Idolm@ster 2
The Idolm@ster Live For You!
The Idolmaster Twins
The Last Remnant
Tom Clancy's Ghost Recon Advanced Warfighter
Tom Clancy's H.A.W.X.
Tom Clancy's Rainbow Six: Vegas
Tom Clancy's Rainbow Six: Vegas 2
Tom Clancy's Splinter Cell: Conviction
Tropico 3
Trusty Bell: Chopin no Yume Reprise
Virtua Fighter 5: Live Arena

Xbox One

Games in Greatest Hits for Xbox One series
Assassin's Creed IV Black Flag
Assassin's Creed Brotherhood
Assassin's Creed Unity
Assassin's Creed Syndicate
Bioshock: The Collection
Borderlands: The Handsome Collection
Bully (video game)
Call of Duty: Modern Warfare Remastered
The Crew
Tom Clancy's The Division
Dead Rising 3
Dishonored 2
Doom
The Elder Scrolls 4: Oblivion
Far Cry 3
Far Cry 4
Forza Horizon 2
Forza Motorsport 5
Forza Motorsport 6
Gears of War: Ultimate Edition
Halo: The Master Chief Collection
Halo 5: Guardians
Killer Instinct
Kinect Sports Rivals
NBA 2K20
Need for Speed Rivals
Rayman Legends
Rayman Origins
Rise of the Tomb Raider
Ryse: Son of Rome
Sunset Overdrive
Tom Clancy's Rainbow Six Siege
Watch Dogs
Wolfenstein: The New Order
Zoo Tycoon

See also
List of Xbox games
List of Xbox 360 games

References

External links
Official list of Platinum Hits
Official list of Best of Platinum Hits
Official list of Platinum Family Hits
Official list of titles in the Platinum Collection
Official list of titles in the Xbox One Greatest Hits
Official List of Classics and Best of Classics
Microsoft to start $10 hits program on Gamespot.com

Budget ranges